Flahavan is a surname. Notable people with the surname include:

Aaron Flahavan (1975–2001), English footballer
Darryl Flahavan (born 1978), English footballer and coach

See also
Flahavan's, family-owned oat milling company based in Southeast Ireland